Li Shan (Chinese: 李鳝; c.1686–1762) was a Qing dynasty painter born in Jiangsu. He had an interest in painting at an early age and by 16 was a noteworthy painter.  His paintings had an unrestricted quality and were influenced by Shitao. He was one of the Eight Eccentrics of Yangzhou.

Aside from painting he also served as a magistrate for a county in Shandong. Li Shan is also the name for two modern Chinese painters, one born in 1885 and the other in 1926.

External links

Chinaculture.org
Ink bamboo in the collection of the Metropolitan Museum, New York
"Swallows", painting in the collection of the Metropolitan Museum, New York

1686 births
1762 deaths
Qing dynasty painters
Politicians from Taizhou, Jiangsu
Painters from Taizhou, Jiangsu
Qing dynasty politicians from Jiangsu